Manaf Younus Hashim Al-Tekreeti (born 16 November 1996) is an Iraqi professional footballer who plays as a centre-back for Iraqi Premier League club Al-Shorta and the Iraq national team.

Club career
In March 2020 Manaf signed for Al-Shorta on loan until the end of the season.

International career
In November 2021, Younis was called up to Iraq as part of their 2021 FIFA Arab Cup squad. He made his debut in the starting line-up for the national team in their opening match against Oman. On 19 January 2023, he scored his first international goal in the stoppage time of extra-time in a 3–2 win over Oman in the 25th Arabian Gulf Cup final, to earn his country their first title in the competition since 1988.

International goals

Honours

Club
Al-Karkh
Iraq FA Cup: 2021–22

Al-Shorta
Iraqi Super Cup: 2022

International
Iraq
 Arabian Gulf Cup: 2023

References

Living people
1996 births
Iraqi footballers
Association football central defenders
Al-Shorta SC players